Stephen Thomas Ochsner (born 25 July 1988) is an American Russian actor, director, producer, musician, translator and designer, widely known for his role as Kostya in the more.tv original series, Chicks.

Early life
Ochsner's childhood was spent singing in the United Methodist Church Choir, acting in community theatre and studying music at the Colorado Springs Conservatory and Central City Opera House. His first job was working as a janitor and technical assistant at the Millibo Art Theatre. Ochsner was also an avid snowboarder, rock climber and mountaineer. He received his formal acting and vocal training at the Oklahoma City University School of Theatre, while he built and demounted sets in the university scene shop. At that time, Ochsner worked as an actor and dramaturg for Oklahoma City Repertory Theatre. Between the years of 15 and 20, Ochsner played 11 leading and supporting roles across the midwest, including Mercutio in Romeo and Juliet, George in Our Town, Shen Teh in The Good Person of Szechwan, Kaspar in Amahl and the Night Visitors, Toby in The Medium and Valère in The Miser.

Theatre
In 2008, Ochsner studied for three months at the Moscow Art Theatre School Studio on a program organized by the National Institute of Theatre. Returning to Oklahoma City University, Ochsner led a weekly actor's training laboratory based on the techniques of Michael Chekhov, Vsevolod Meyerhold and Andrei Droznin.

In 2011, Ochsner studied with Viktor Ryzhakov, Igor Zolotovitsky, Sergei Zemtsov and Vladimir Sazhin at the Moscow Art Theatre School Studio. 
He subsequently studied with Sergei Golomazov at the Russian Institute of Theatre Arts, and in 2012 received his first roles at the Meyerhold Theatre Centre in Everything's Fine (Między nami dobrze jest) by Dorota Masłowska and Sentensii Panteleya Karmanova (The Maxims of Peter Pockets) by Ivan Vyrypaev.

Between 2012 and 2016, Ochsner toured Europe, Russia and the US with Vyrypaev's texts in Russian and English under the direction of Zara Antonyan. Later Ochsner worked with Antonyan co-directing, composing and designing projections for productions based on Hrant Dink and The Master and Margarita at Theater Krefeld und Mönchengladbach, Germany.

From 2014 to 2017, Ochsner lived in Yerevan, Armenia, co-directing, designing, composing and acting at the Yerevan State Puppet Theatre. He also taught acting at the Yerevan State Institute of Theatre and Cinematography.

Filmography 
Ochsner is widely known for his role in the more.tv original series Chicks, about four young women struggling to liberate themselves from the volatile, sex industry in the provincial Caucuses. Ochsner plays the ex-lover to Zhanna (played by Irina Gorbacheva), working as a backhoe operator and fighting to be a good father for his son, Roma (played by Daniil Kuznetsov).

Ochsner's first cinematic role was in Alexei Popogrebski's The Optimists, a foreign diplomacy series set in the Krushchev era at the peak of the Cold War. He played a foreign director in Roskino’s Shoot Moscow in Moscow, produced by Stereotactic for the Russian Pavilion at the 2017 Cannes Film Festival. He played the drug-crazed roommate of Rose (played by Jordan Frye) in Grigory Dobrygin’s Sheena667, and the mysterious man transporting contraband across the Finish border in RIO, written and directed by Zhenia Kazankina. Ochsner has also played roles in Going Vertical, False Flag, and Roommate.

Radio and voice over
Ochsner hosted two seasons of Home Away from Home, a program investigating national identity at Radio VAN, Armenia at Radio VAN.

Ochsner has worked in animated films, with credits such as Delphi in Magic Arch 3D, Pelican Duke in Big Trip, Flow in The Other Way Wolf and Stroosh, Luca and Myrrah in Stroosh.

Music
Ochnser has directed, produced and performed in projects “GoatfishSauce” and “Karl and Klara” with singer-songwriter Mitya Zolotov (2014–present). He has also been a member of the project “Kristmas” since it was formed by Cazimir Liske (2011–present).

References

External links

 Stephen Thomas Ochsner on Kinopoisk

1988 births
Living people
American film actors
Russian film actors
Russian television actors
American stage actors
Russian stage actors
21st-century American male actors